Sir John Spelman (died 1546) was an English judge from Norfolk, noted for his composition of law reports.

Origins
Born about 1480, he was the fourth son and youngest child of Henry Spelman (died 1496), of Bekerton in Stow Bedon, a lawyer and judge who was a Reader of Gray's Inn and Recorder of Norwich, and his second wife Ela, widow of Thomas Shouldham (died 1472), of Marham, and daughter and coheiress of William Narborough, of Narborough.

His Spelman ancestors originated in Hampshire, where before 1272 they held the manor of Brockenhurst, but by 1369 had moved to Norfolk where they had lands in and later acquired the manor of Bekerton.

Career
About 1500, he followed his father to study law at Gray's Inn, where he served as Reader three times, and in 1521 was created a serjeant, followed next year by gaining his father's old post of Recorder of Norwich. In 1526 he was promoted to King's Serjeant and in 1531 was appointed a Justice of the King's Bench, being sworn in by the Lord Chancellor, Sir Thomas More. Knighted in 1532, he went as a justice of assize on the Northern Circuit, changing to the Home Circuit in 1537. From 1540 he stopped going on circuit and sat at Westminster Hall.

in 1521 he bought from Sir Edmund Knyvett and his wife Anne the portion of the manor of Bydon in Stow Bedon that he did not already own. After the death of his half-brother Thomas Shouldham, he obtained the estate of Narborough and built his family home of Narborough Hall, where his descendants lived until 1773. It contains a stone tablet with his coat of arms that he put up in 1528. In 1537 he was granted the manor of Gracys in Narborough, belonging to the suppressed Pentney Priory.

He died in office on 26 January 1546 and was buried at Narborough, where his memorial brass can be seen.

Law reports
His fame comes from his compilation of law reports, starting not only with cases he attended in court but also with lectures and seminars held at Gray's Inn. From 1521 he mainly covered common pleas and after 1531 King's Bench cases. He also summarised practitioners' discussions on points of law and judges' conferences.
Among significant processes he recorded were the proceedings against Cardinal Wolsey in 1530, the trials of Bishop John Fisher and Sir Thomas More in 1535, the trial and execution of Queen Anne Boleyn in 1536, and Lord Dacre's case in 1541.

Family
He married Elizabeth, daughter and coheiress of Sir Henry Frowick (died 1527), of South Mimms, and niece of Sir Thomas Frowick, Chief Justice of the Common Pleas. Her mother was Sir Henry's first wife Anne, daughter and coheiress of Robert Knollys, of North Mimms, and his wife Elizabeth Troutbeck (died 1458).

They had thirteen sons and seven daughters, the second son being
Henry Spelman (died 1581), who married first Anne, the widow of Thomas Thursby (d.1543) of Ashwicken, the son of Thomas Thursby (d.1510), Merchant, thrice Mayor of King's Lynn and the founder and benefactor of Thoresby College, daughter of Sir Thomas Knyvett and his wife Muriel, widow of John Grey, 2nd Viscount Lisle, and daughter of Thomas Howard, 2nd Duke of Norfolk and Elizabeth Tilney. Anne Knyvett was through her mother a first cousin of both Queens Anne Boleyn and Katherine Howard, and a half-sister of Elizabeth Grey, 3rd Viscountess Lisle and 5th Baroness Lisle (1505–1519), one time betrothed of Charles Brandon and the wife of Henry Courtenay. His second wife was Frances (died 1622), daughter of William Saunders, of Ewell, and his second wife Joan. With Frances, his children included the antiquary Sir Henry Spelman and Erasmus Spelman, whose son Henry went to Virginia.
The widowed Elizabeth married secondly John Coningsby, of North Mimms, son of the judge Sir Humphrey Coningsby, and became the mother of Sir Henry Coningsby. After her second husband's death in 1547, she married William Dodd and died on 5 November 1556, being buried at North Mimms.

References
Frederick Bernays Wiener, "New Light on Law in Henry VIII's Time" (1979) 65 ABA Journal 1340 et seq. JSTOR

1480s births
1546 deaths
People from King's Lynn and West Norfolk (district)
Serjeants-at-law (England)
16th-century English judges
Justices of the King's Bench
English landowners
Knights Bachelor